Kóczián is a surname. Notable people with the surname include:

Éva Kóczián (born 1936), Hungarian table tennis player
Jenő Kóczián (born 1967), Hungarian shot put athlete
Johanna von Koczian (born 1933), German actress and singer
József Kóczián (1926–2009), Hungarian table tennis player

See also

Kocian
Kocjan (disambiguation)
Kocyan